Eurybelodon is an extinct genus of proboscidean in the family Amebelodontidae.

Taxonomy
The type specimen, a partial upper tusk, was described from Black Butte in western Oregon in 1963. It was originally assigned to the genus Platybelodon, but was reclassified as a distinct genus after a 2016 analysis revealed key morphological differences between it and other amebelodontids.  Though it was originally classified in the family Gomphotheriidae with Platybelodon and Amebelodon, it was moved when the subfamily Amebelodontinae was elevated to a distinct family.

The genus name comes from the Greek eury, which means broad, and belodon, meaning front tooth. The specific name of the type species is dedicated to Jeheskel Shoshani, who made significant contributions to proboscidean research.

References

Amebelodontidae
Miocene proboscideans
Miocene mammals of North America
Prehistoric placental genera
Fossil taxa described in 2016